Platycorynus is a genus of leaf beetles in the subfamily Eumolpinae. It is distributed in Africa and Asia.

Taxonomy
The generic name "Platycorynus" first appeared in the second and third editions of Dejean's Catalogue of Coleoptera, where it was attributed to Chevrolat. Nine species were listed for the genus, four of which were nomina nuda at the time of publication, but no formal description was given for it. The genus was later briefly characterized by Frederick William Hope in 1840, under the new name "Corynodes". In 1865, Thomas Ansell Marshall published a monograph on Corynodes, dividing it into seven subgenera: Platycorynus, Corynodes, Theumorus, Eurycorynus, Omodon, Erigenes, and Bathycolpus. The latter five were originally intended to be new genera. In the same year, Hamlet Clark created a new genus, Corynoeides, for one of the species placed in Corynodes. However, Joseph Sugar Baly did not accept Clark's genus nor Marshall's subdivisions. In 1956, Monrós & Bechyné pointed out that Platycorynus Chevrolat in Dejean, 1836 was available and had priority over Corynodes Hope, 1840, and that therefore the former should be used as the valid name for the genus.

According to Volume 6 of the Catalogue of Palearctic Coleoptera, published in 2010, Corynodes, Corynoeides, Eudora, Neolycaria and all of Marshall's subgenera are now treated as synonyms of Platycorynus.

Species
The genus includes the following species:

 Platycorynus abyssinicus (Jacoby, 1886)
 Platycorynus abyssinicus abyssinicus (Jacoby, 1886)
 Platycorynus abyssinicus niloticus Kuntzen, 1914
 Platycorynus aemulus (Lefèvre, 1889)
 Platycorynus aeneus Baly, 1864
 Platycorynus affinis (Chen, 1934)
 Platycorynus ahmadi (Abdullah & Qureshi, 1969)
 Platycorynus amethystinus (Marshall, 1865)
 Platycorynus andamanensis (Lefèvre, 1891)
 Platycorynus angularis Tan, 1982
 Platycorynus angulicollis (Jacoby, 1884)
 Platycorynus apicalis Kimoto & Gressitt, 1982
 Platycorynus approximans Baly, 1864
 Platycorynus arcuatefasciatus (Pic, 1938)
 Platycorynus argentipilus Tan, 1982
 Platycorynus asphodelus (Marshall, 1865)
 Platycorynus assamensis (Baly, 1879)
 Platycorynus aureipennis (Baly, 1867)
 Platycorynus azureus (Sahlberg, 1829)
 Platycorynus backoensis Medvedev & Rybakova, 1985
 Platycorynus bakeri (Weise, 1922)
 Platycorynus balyi (Jacoby, 1884)
 Platycorynus basalis (Jacoby, 1884)
 Platycorynus bellus (Chen, 1940)
 Platycorynus bengalensis (Duvivier, 1890)
 Platycorynus biseriatus Baly, 1864
 Platycorynus brevipennis (Jacoby, 1896)
 Platycorynus buonloicus Medvedev & Rybakova, 1985
 Platycorynus cavifrons (Jacoby, 1908)
 Platycorynus ceylonensis (Jacoby, 1908)
 Platycorynus chalybaeus (Marshall, 1865)
 Platycorynus chrysis (Olivier, 1808)
 Platycorynus chrysochoides Chen, 1940
 Platycorynus chapanus (Chen, 1934)
 Platycorynus circumductus (Marshall, 1865)
 Platycorynus coelestinus Baly, 1864
 Platycorynus coeruleatus (Baly, 1867)
 Platycorynus coeruleicollis (Pic, 1940)
 Platycorynus compressicornis (Fabricius, 1801)
 Platycorynus congener Baly, 1864
 Platycorynus costatus Baly, 1864
 Platycorynus costipennis (Chen, 1940)
 Platycorynus cribratellus (Fairmaire, 1885)
 Platycorynus cumingi Baly, 1864
 Platycorynus cupreoviridis Tan, 1992
 Platycorynus cupreatus (Baly, 1867)
 Platycorynus cupreus Baly, 1864
 Platycorynus cyanicollis (Olivier, 1791)
 Platycorynus davidi (Lefèvre, 1887)
 Platycorynus decemnotatus (Baly, 1860)
 Platycorynus dejeani Bertoloni, 1849
 Platycorynus deletus (Lefèvre, 1890)
 Platycorynus dentatus Tan, 1982
 Platycorynus descarpentriesi (Selman, 1970)
 Platycorynus discoidalis (Jacoby, 1898)
 Platycorynus dohrni Baly, 1864
 Platycorynus egenus (Lefèvre, 1887)
 Platycorynus egregrius (Lefèvre, 1885)
 Platycorynus elegantulus Baly, 1864
 Platycorynus fabricii Baly, 1864
 Platycorynus faroogi (Abdullah & Qureshi, 1969)
 Platycorynus fraternus Baly, 1864
 Platycorynus fulgurans (Marshall, 1865)
 Platycorynus fuscoaeneus Baly, 1864
 Platycorynus gibbosus (Chen, 1934)
 Platycorynus grahami Gressitt & Kimoto, 1961
 Platycorynus gratiosus Baly, 1864
 Platycorynus hijau Medvedev & Takizawa, 2011
 Platycorynus hirsutus (Jacoby, 1895)
 Platycorynus igneicollis (Hope, 1843)
 Platycorynus igneipennis (Baly, 1867)
 Platycorynus igneofasciatus (Baly, 1860)
 Platycorynus ignitus Baly, 1864
 Platycorynus impressicollis (Jacoby, 1908)
 Platycorynus indigaceus Chevrolat, 1841
 Platycorynus iridescens (Berlioz, 1917)
 Platycorynus janthinus (Marshall, 1865)
 Platycorynus japonicus (Jacoby, 1896)
 Platycorynus japonicus japonicus (Jacoby, 1896)
 Platycorynus japonicus umebayanashii Kimoto, 1974
 Platycorynus kivuensis (Burgeon, 1940)
 Platycorynus laeviusculus (Lefèvre, 1888)
 Platycorynus languei (Lefèvre, 1893)
 Platycorynus laosensis Kimoto & Gressitt, 1982
 Platycorynus lateralis (Hope, 1831)
 Platycorynus latus (Pic, 1934)
 Platycorynus lefevrei (Jacoby, 1895)
 Platycorynus limbatus (Baly, 1881)
 Platycorynus limbatus congoensis (Burgeon, 1940)
 Platycorynus limbatus limbatus (Baly, 1881)
 Platycorynus longicornis Baly, 1864
 Platycorynus lorquini (Baly, 1867)
 Platycorynus malachiticus (Marshall, 1865)
 Platycorynus marginalis (Weise, 1912)
 Platycorynus marginalis luluensis (Burgeon, 1940)
 Platycorynus marginalis marginalis (Weise, 1912)
 Platycorynus marshalli Baly, 1864
 Platycorynus mentaweiensis (Jacoby, 1896)
 Platycorynus micans (Chen, 1934)
 Platycorynus micheli (Lesne, 1900)
 Platycorynus minutus (Pic, 1934)
 Platycorynus modestus (Jacoby, 1908)
 Platycorynus monstrosus (Baly, 1867)
 Platycorynus mouhoti Baly, 1864
 Platycorynus multicostatus (Jacoby, 1895)
 Platycorynus mutabilis Baly, 1864
 Platycorynus nasiri (Abdullah & Qureshi, 1969)
 Platycorynus niger (Chen, 1940)
 Platycorynus niger niger (Chen, 1940)
 Platycorynus niger yunnanensis Tan, 1982
 Platycorynus nigripes (J. Thomson, 1858)
 Platycorynus nitidus (Fabricius, 1792)
 Platycorynus obesus (Jacoby, 1908)
 Platycorynus parryi Baly, 1864
 Platycorynus parvofossulatus (Kuntzen, 1913)
 Platycorynus parvulus Baly, 1864
 Platycorynus peregrinus (Herbst, 1783)
 Platycorynus perplexus Baly, 1864
 Platycorynus plebejus (Weise, 1889)
 Platycorynus pretiosus Baly, 1864
 Platycorynus propinquus (Baly, 1867)
 Platycorynus pubicollis Medvedev & Rybakova, 1985
 Platycorynus pulchellus (Baly, 1860)
 Platycorynus punctatissimus (Frölich, 1792)
 Platycorynus punctatus Tan, 1982
 Platycorynus purpureimicans Tan, 1982
 Platycorynus pyrophorus (Parry, 1843)
 Platycorynus pyrospilotus (Baly, 1860)
 Platycorynus raffrayi (Lefèvre, 1877)
 Platycorynus robustus Baly, 1864
 Platycorynus roseus Tan, 1982
 Platycorynus rufescens Medvedev & Takizawa, 2011
 Platycorynus rufipennis (Pic, 1934)
 Platycorynus rugipennis (Jacoby, 1895)
 Platycorynus rugosus Kimoto & Gressitt, 1982
 Platycorynus rutilans (Lefèvre, 1884)
 Platycorynus sauteri (Chûjô, 1938)
 Platycorynus schwaneri (Lefèvre, 1890)
 Platycorynus sheppardi Baly, 1864
 Platycorynus simplicicornis (Lefèvre, 1885)
 Platycorynus speciosus (Lefèvre, 1891)
 Platycorynus splendens Medvedev, 2015
 Platycorynus stevensi Baly, 1864
 Platycorynus suaveolus (Marshall, 1865)
 Platycorynus subcarinatus (Pic, 1927)
 Platycorynus subcostatus (Jacoby, 1894)
 Platycorynus sulcus Tan, 1982
 Platycorynus sumbawensis (Jacoby, 1895)
 Platycorynus superbus (Weise, 1922)
 Platycorynus tonkinensis (Lefèvre, 1893)
 Platycorynus travancorensis (Jacoby, 1908)
 Platycorynus tridentatus (Jacoby, 1908)
 Platycorynus trilobatus (Baly, 1867)
 Platycorynus tuberculatus Baly, 1864
 Platycorynus undatus (Olivier, 1791)
 Platycorynus unituberculatus (Jacoby, 1894)
 Platycorynus verschureni Selman, 1972
 Platycorynus victinus (Pic, 1940)
 Platycorynus viridanus (Baly, 1867)
 Platycorynus waterhousei Baly, 1864

Synonyms:
 Corynodes beauchenei Jacoby, 1889: synonym of Platycorynus aemulus (Lefèvre, 1889)
 Corynodes dilaticollis Jacoby, 1892: synonym of Platycorynus chalybaeus (Marshall, 1865)
 Corynodes fonkineus Lefèvre, 1893: synonym of  Platycorynus deletus (Lefèvre, 1890)
 Corynodes gibbifrons Lefèvre, 1885: synonym of Platycorynus gratiosus Baly, 1864
 Corynodes paviei Lefèvre, 1890: synonym of Platycorynus chalybaeus (Marshall, 1865)
 Platycorynus birmanicus (Jacoby, 1896): synonym of Platycorynus chalybaeus (Marshall, 1865)
 Platycorynus florentini (Lefèvre, 1893): synonym of Platycorynus speciosus (Lefèvre, 1891)

Species moved to other genera:
 Corynodes (?) fulvicollis Jacoby, 1889: moved to Chalcolema

Gallery

References

 Synopsis of the described Coleoptera of the World
 The African Eumolpinae site

Eumolpinae
Chrysomelidae genera
Beetles of Africa
Beetles of Asia
Taxa named by Louis Alexandre Auguste Chevrolat